Bruce Lindsay Grant (1963–1995) was an alpine skier from New Zealand.

In the 1984 Winter Olympics at Sarajevo, Grant came 31st in the downhill event. His sister Christine Grant competed at the same Olympics, also in alpine skiing.

On 13 August 1995, Grant died during a violent storm while descending from the summit of K2 in Pakistan.

See also
1995 K2 disaster
List of deaths on eight-thousanders

References

External links  

The Leading Edge (movie) Cast: Mathurin Molgat, Bruce Grant, Christine Grant, Evan Bloomfield, Mark Whetu, Melanie Forbes, Billy T. James. 74 minutes, 1987.

1960 births
1995 deaths
New Zealand male alpine skiers
Olympic alpine skiers of New Zealand
Alpine skiers at the 1984 Winter Olympics
New Zealand mountain climbers
Mountaineering deaths on K2
Accidental deaths in Pakistan